Moorland or moor is a type of habitat found in upland areas in temperate grasslands, savannas, and shrublands and montane grasslands and shrublands biomes, characterised by low-growing vegetation on acidic soils. Moorland, nowadays, generally means uncultivated hill land (such as Dartmoor in South West England), but also includes low-lying wetlands (such as Sedgemoor, also South West England). It is closely related to heath, although experts disagree on what precisely distinguishes these types of vegetation. Generally, moor refers to highland and high rainfall zones, whereas heath refers to lowland zones which are more likely to be the result of human activity.
Moorland habitats mostly occur in tropical Africa, northern and western Europe, and neotropical South America. Most of the world's moorlands are diverse ecosystems. In the extensive moorlands of the tropics, biodiversity can be extremely high. Moorland also bears a relationship to tundra (where the subsoil is permafrost or permanently frozen soil), appearing as the tundra and the natural tree zone. The boundary between tundra and moorland constantly shifts with climatic change.

Heather moorland 

Heathland and moorland are the most extensive areas of semi-natural vegetation in the British Isles. The eastern British moorlands are similar to heaths but are differentiated by having a covering of peat. On western moors, the peat layer may be several metres thick. Scottish "muirs" are generally heather moors, but also have extensive covering of grass, cotton-grass, mosses, bracken and under-shrubs such as crowberry, with the wetter moorland having sphagnum moss merging into bog-land.

There is uncertainty about how many moors were created by human activity. Oliver Rackham writes that pollen analysis shows that some moorland, such as in the islands and extreme north of Scotland, are clearly natural, never having had trees, whereas much of the Pennine moorland area was forested in Mesolithic times. How much the deforestation was caused by climatic changes and how much by human activity is uncertain.

Ecology 
A variety of distinct habitat types are found in different world regions of moorland. The wildlife and vegetation forms often lead to high endemism because of the severe soil and microclimate characteristics. An example of this is the Exmoor Pony, a rare horse breed which has adapted to the harsh conditions in England's Exmoor.

In Europe, the associated fauna consists of bird species such as red grouse, hen harrier, merlin, golden plover, curlew, skylark, meadow pipit, whinchat, ring ouzel, and twite. Other species dominate in moorlands elsewhere. Reptiles are few due to the cooler conditions. In Europe, only the common viper is frequent, though in other regions moorlands are commonly home to dozens of reptile species. Amphibians such as frogs are well represented in moorlands. When moorland is overgrazed, woody vegetation is often lost, being replaced by coarse, unpalatable grasses and bracken, with a greatly reduced fauna.

Some hill sheep breeds, such as Scottish Blackface and the Lonk, thrive on the austere conditions of heather moors.

Management 
Burning of moorland has been practised for a number of reasons, for example, when grazing is insufficient to control growth. This is recorded in Britain in the fourteenth century. Uncontrolled burning frequently caused (and causes) problems and was forbidden by statute in 1609. With the rise of sheep and grouse management in the nineteenth century, it again became common practice. Heather is burnt at about 10 or 12 years old when it will regenerate easily. Left longer, the woodier stems will burn more aggressively and will hinder regrowth. Burning of moorland vegetation needs to be very carefully controlled, as the peat itself can catch fire, and this can be difficult if not impossible to extinguish. In addition, uncontrolled burning of heather can promote alternative bracken and rough grass growth, which ultimately produces poorer grazing. As a result, burning is now a controversial practice; Rackham calls it "second-best land management".

Mechanical cutting of the heather has been used in Europe, but it is important for the material to be removed to avoid smothering regrowth. If heather and other vegetation are left for too long, a large volume of dry and combustible material builds up. This may result in a wildfire burning out a large area, although it has been found that heather seeds germinate better if subject to the brief heat of controlled burning.

In terms of managing moorlands for wildlife, in the UK, vegetation characteristics are important for passerine abundance, whilst predator control benefits red grouse, golden plover, and curlew abundances. To benefit multiple species, many management options are required. However, management needs to be carried out in locations that are also suitable for species in terms of physical characteristics such as topography, climate and soil.

Moorland in literature 

The development of a sensitivity to nature and one's physical surroundings grew with the rise of interest in landscape painting, and particularly the works of artists that favoured wide and deep prospects, and rugged scenery. To the English Romantic imagination, moorlands fitted this image perfectly, enhancing the emotional impact of the story by placing it within a heightened and evocative landscape. Moorland forms the setting of various works of late Romantic English literature, ranging from the Yorkshire moorland in Emily Brontë's Wuthering Heights and The Secret Garden by Frances Hodgson Burnett to Dartmoor in Arthur Conan Doyle's Holmesian mystery The Hound of the Baskervilles. They are also featured in Charlotte Bronte's Jane Eyre representing the heroine's desolation and loneliness after leaving Mr Rochester.

Enid Blyton's Famous Five series featured the young protagonists adventuring across various moorlands where they confronted criminals or other individuals of interest. Such a setting enhanced the plot as the drama unfolded away from the functioning world where the children could solve their own problems and face greater danger. Moorland in the Forest of Bowland in Lancashire is the setting for Walter Bennett's The Pendle Witches, the true story of some of England's most infamous witch trials. In Erin Hunter's Warriors series, one of the four Clans, WindClan, lives in the moorland alone.

Michael Jecks, author of Knights Templar Mysteries, sets his books in and around Dartmoor, England. Paul Kingsnorth’s Beast is also set on a western English moor, using the barren landscape and fields of heather to communicate themes of timelessness and distance from civilization.

Notable moorlands

Africa

Democratic Republic of the Congo 
 Ruwenzori-Virunga montane moorlands

Ethiopia 
 Ethiopian montane moorlands

Kenya 
 East African montane moorlands
 Mount Kenya

Rwanda 
 Ruwenzori-Virunga montane moorlands

Sudan 
 East African montane moorlands
 Ethiopian montane moorlands

Tanzania 
 East African montane moorlands
 Kilimanjaro
 Mount Meru

Uganda 
 East African montane moorlands

Europe

Austria 
 Tanner Moor
 Längsee Moor
 Moorbad Gmös

Belgium 
 Weißer Stein (Eifel)
 High Fens

France 
 Monts d'Arrée

Germany 
 Großes Torfmoor
 Hücker Moor
 Oppenwehe Moor
 Worringer Bruch
 High Fens

The Netherlands 
 Dwingelderveld
 Bargerveen
 Fochteloërveen
 The Peel

Great Britain 
Great Britain is home to an estimated 10–15% of the world's moors. Notable areas of upland moorland in Britain include the Lake District, the Pennines (including the Dark Peak and Forest of Bowland), Mid Wales, the Southern Uplands of Scotland, the Scottish Highlands, and a few pockets in the West Country.

 Bleaklow, Dark Peak
 Bodmin Moor, Cornwall
 Black Mountains, Wales
 Brecon Beacons, Wales
 Dartmoor, Devon
 Drumossie Moor, often called Culloden Moor, the site of the Battle of Culloden
 Exmoor, West Somerset & North Devon
 Forest of Bowland, Lancashire
 Hexhamshire Moors, Northumberland and County Durham
 North York Moors, North Yorkshire
 Migneint, Gwynedd
 Mynydd Hiraethog, Denbighshire and Conwy
 Penwith, Cornwall
 Rannoch Moor, Highlands, Scotland
 Rombalds Moor (including Ilkley Moor), West Yorkshire
 Rossendale Valley, Lancashire
 Saddleworth Moor, Greater Manchester
 Shropshire Hills, small pockets of moorland such as the Long Mynd
 West Pennine Moors, including Oswaldtwistle Moor, Haslingden Moor, Rivington Moor and Darwen Moor in Lancashire
 Yorkshire Dales National Park, North Yorkshire 
 Ythan Estuary complex, Aberdeenshire, Scotland: largest coastal moorland in the British Isles, known for high biodiversity

Spain 
Moorlands are called páramos in Spanish. They are particularly common in Northern Spain and the Meseta Central.
 Boedo, Palencia, Castile 
 Páramo del Duratón, Castile
 Paramo de Masa, Burgos, Castile
 Páramo del Sil, Galicia
 Las Loras, Castile

South America

Argentina 
 Magellanic moorland

Chile 
 Magellanic moorland

Colombia 
Colombia is one of only three countries in the world to be home to páramo (tropical moorland) and more than 60% of the paramo regions are found on its soil.
 Sumapaz Páramo, Bogota
 Chingaza National Natural Park, Cundinamarca department
 Oceta Páramo, Boyacá Department
 Iguaque, Boyacá Department
 Puracé, Cauca Department
 , Santander Department

See also 

 Fen
 Siskiyou plateau and the high desert (Oregon) – two similar habitats, although more arid, found in western North America
 Páramo

References 

Temperate grasslands, savannas, and shrublands
Habitats
Landforms
Land management
Cultural landscapes